Ake Kule Lake is a lake in Altay Prefecture, Xinjiang, China, close to the borders of Kazakhstan, Mongolia and Russia.

References

Lakes of Xinjiang